Voksenåsen is a hill and neighborhood in Vestre Aker borough in Oslo, Norway.

Education 
Down towards Bogstad is the Grindbakken primary school. With the exception of Voksentoppen Skole, a special school for children with disabilities, no other schools are located in the area. Middle-School students from the area walk, bike, drive or take the train down to Midtstuen School, while one has to go closer to the center of Oslo to find the nearest high school.

References

Neighbourhoods of Oslo